Robat (also Romanized as Robāţ; also known as Robāţ-e Pasākūh) is a village in Pasakuh Rural District, Zavin District, Kalat County, Razavi Khorasan Province, Iran. At the 2006 census, its population was 25, in 5 families.

References 

Populated places in Kalat County